The 1996 Chase Championships was a tennis tournament played on indoor carpet courts at Madison Square Garden in New York City, New York in the United States. It was the 25th edition of the year-end singles championships, the 21st edition of the year-end doubles championships, and was part of the 1996 WTA Tour. The tournament was held from November 18 through November 24, 1996. First-seeded Steffi Graf won the singles title after defeating Martina Hingis in the final, which was the last women's match played over five sets.

Finals

Singles

 Steffi Graf defeated  Martina Hingis, 6–3, 4–6, 6–0, 4–6, 6–0.
 It was Graf's 7th singles title of the year and the 102nd of her career.

Doubles

 Lindsay Davenport /  Mary Joe Fernández defeated  Jana Novotná /  Arantxa Sánchez Vicario, 6–3, 6–2.
 It was Davenport's 8th title of the year and the 18th of her career. It was Fernández's 5th title of the year and the 23rd of her career.

References

External links
 Official website

WTA Tour Championships
Chase Championships
Chase Championships
Chase Championships
1990s in Manhattan
Chase Championships
Madison Square Garden
Sports competitions in New York City
Sports in Manhattan
Tennis tournaments in New York City